Leonid Aleksandrovich Pakhomov (born 17 February 1943) is a Russian football manager and a former player.

Honours
 Soviet Cup winner: 1968, 1972.
 Soviet Top League bronze: 1968.
 Top-33 year-end best players list: 1971 (No. 3)

External links
 

1943 births
Footballers from Baku
Living people
Soviet footballers
Association football defenders
FC Kuban Krasnodar players
FC Torpedo Moscow players
Soviet Top League players
Soviet football managers
Russian football managers
FC Kairat managers
Kazakhstan national football team managers
Russian expatriate football managers
Expatriate football managers in Kazakhstan